The Kharagpur–Viluppuram Superfast Express is an Superfast Express train belonging to Southern Railway zone that runs between  and  in India. It is operating with 22603/22604 train numbers on a weekly basis.

Service 

Route and halts 
The important halts of the train are:
  
 
         
  
 
 
 
 
 
 
 
 
 
 Tiruvannamalai

Coach composition
The train has standard ICF rakes with a max speed of 110 kmph. The train consists of 18 coaches:
 1 AC II Tier
 2 AC III Tier
 7 Sleeper coaches
 6 General Unreserved
 2 Seating cum Luggage Rake

Traction
Both trains are hauled by an Erode Loco Shed-based WAP-4 electric locomotive from Kharagpur to Viluppuram and vice versa.

Rake sharing
The train shares its rake with 22605/22606 Purulia–Villupuram Superfast Express.

Direction reversal
The train reverses its direction 1 times:

Demands 
There are demands to extend this train till Puducherry from Villupuram Junction.

See also 
 Kharagpur Junction railway station
 Viluppuram Junction railway station
 Purulia–Villupuram Superfast Express

Notes

References

External links 
 22603/Kharagpur–Villupuram Superfast Express India Rail Info
 22604/Villupuram–Kharagpur Superfast Express India Rail Info

Transport in Kharagpur
Express trains in India
Rail transport in West Bengal
Rail transport in Odisha
Rail transport in Andhra Pradesh
Rail transport in Tamil Nadu
Railway services introduced in 2012